Hema Malini, an Indian actress, has been part of over 100 projects, primarily in Hindi films.

Filmography 
Actress

Director
Dil Aashna Hai (1992)
Tell Me O Kkhuda (2011)

Television

Music videos

Notes

References

Indian filmographies
Actress filmographies